The Bastard Brother of God is a 1986 drama film directed by Benito Rabal and starring Francisco Rabal, Asunción Balaguer and Agustín González. It is an adaption of the novel by José Luis Coll. It is about the Spanish Civil War and the Franco's rule.

Cast

References

External links
 

Spanish drama films
1986 drama films
1986 films
Films based on Spanish novels
Spanish Civil War films
1986 in Spain